The Connacht Senior Hurling Championship, known simply as the Connacht Championship, was an annual inter-county hurling competition organised by the Connacht Council of the Gaelic Athletic Association (GAA). It was the highest inter-county hurling competition in the province of Connacht, and was contested almost every year between 1900 and 1922 before a revival in the 1990s.

The final served as the culmination of a series of games played during the summer months, and the results determined which team received the M. J. "Inky" Flaherty Cup. The championship was always played on a straight knockout basis whereby once a team lost they were eliminated from the championship.

The Connacht Championship was an integral part of the wider All-Ireland Senior Hurling Championship. The winners of the Connacht final, like their counterparts in the other provincial championships in Leinster, Munster and Ulster, advanced directly to the semi-final stage of the All-Ireland series of games.

The title was won at least once by three of the Connacht counties; however, only Galway won the title more than once. The all-time record-holders are Galway, who won the championship on 25 occasions.

As one of the weakest of the four provincial championships, the championship was suspended from 1923 to 1993, with Galway representing the province in the All-Ireland Championship. A brief revival in 1995 failed to reinvigorate hurling in the province and the Connacht Championship was abolished following the 1999 championship.

History

Development
Following the foundation of the Gaelic Athletic Association in 1884, new rules for Gaelic football and hurling were drawn up and published in the United Irishman newspaper. In 1886, county committees began to be established, with several counties affiliating over the next few years. The GAA ran its inaugural All-Ireland Senior Hurling Championship in 1887. The decision to establish that first championship was influenced by several factors. Firstly, inter-club contests in 1885 and 1886 were wildly popular and began to draw huge crowds. Clubs started to travel across the country to play against each other and these matches generated intense interest as the newspapers began to speculate which teams might be considered the best in the country. Secondly, although the number of clubs was growing, many were slow to affiliate to the Association, leaving it short of money. Establishing a central championship held the prospect of enticing GAA clubs to process their affiliations, just as the establishment of the FA Cup had done much in the 1870s to promote the development of the Football Association in England. The championships were open to all affiliated clubs who would first compete in county-based competitions, to be run by local county committees. The winners of each county championship would then proceed to represent that county in the All-Ireland series. For the first and only time in its history the All-Ireland Championship used an open draw format. Six teams entered the first championship, however, this number increased to nine in 1888. Because of this, and in an effort to reduce travelling costs, the GAA decided to introduce provincial championships in Leinster and Munster. It was 1900 before a provincial championship was introduced in Connacht.

Beginnings
The inaugural Connacht Championship featured just two teams, with Galway and Sligo automatically qualifying for the final. Galway won the game by 4–2 to 1–2. Postponements, disqualifications, objections, withdrawals and walkovers were regular occurrences during the initial years of the championship.

Team changes
In spite of contesting the inaugural Connacht Championship in 1900, Sligo never again fielded a team at senior level. Roscommon became the third team to join the championship when they did so in 1901. Over the next twenty years they became to closest challengers to the Galway hegemony. Mayo contested the championship for the first time in 1905 before making just one further appearance in 1909. Leitrim were the only Connacht team never to field a team in the championship.

Suspension
From 1900 to 1922, Galway dominated the championship to such an extent that on only two occasions the championship title was won by a team other than Galway. After representing the province unopposed from 1917 to 1921, a significant defeat by Roscommon in the 1922 final lead to the championship being suspended. Because of this, Galway were the unopposed representatives of the province in the All-Ireland series from 1923 to 1993.

Revival and abolition
After a 70-year absence, the championship was revived in 1995 with Galway and Roscommon fielding teams. Both these teams contested the finals from 1995 to 1999, however, Galway asserted their dominance and claimed all five championship titles with an average winning margin of 14 points. In May 2000 Roscommon announced that they were withdrawing from the championship, thus leading to its abolition.

Trophy and medals
At the end of the Connacht final, the winning team was presented with a trophy. The M. J. "Inky" Flaherty Cup was held by the winning team until the following year's final. Traditionally, the presentation was made at a special rostrum in the stand where GAA and political dignitaries and special guests viewed the match.

The cup was decorated with ribbons in the colours of the winning team. During the game the cup actually had both teams' sets of ribbons attached and the runners-up ribbons are removed before the presentation. The winning captain accepted the cup on behalf of his team before giving a short speech. Individual members of the winning team then had an opportunity to come to the rostrum to lift the cup.

The cup was named after Michael John "Inky" Flaherty. He was a National Hurling League-winning captain with Galway in 1951, however, he never finished on the winning side in a championship game despite playing from 1936 until 1953.

In accordance with GAA rules, the Connacht Council awarded up to twenty-six gold medals to the winners of the Connacht final.

Sponsorship
From 1995 to 1999, the Connacht Championship was sponsored. The sponsor was usually able to determine the championship's sponsorship name.

General statistics

Roll of honour

See also
 All-Ireland Senior Hurling Championship
 Munster Senior Hurling Championship
 Leinster Senior Hurling Championship
 Ulster Senior Hurling Championship

References

 
1900 establishments in Ireland
Connacht GAA inter-county hurling competitions
Defunct hurling competitions
Senior inter-county hurling competitions